Neochloris oleoabundans is a microalga belonging in the class Chlorophyceae. Due to its high lipid content, it has been considered as a candidate organism for cosmetics and biofuel production, as well as feed stock for freshwater mussels.

Neochloris was first isolated from a sand dune in Saudi Arabia by S. Chantanachat sometime between 1958 and 1962.

See also
Algaculture

References

High lipid content microalgae
Sphaeropleales